The  is an office building in the Chiyoda special ward of Tokyo, Japan. Completed on April 30, 2009, it stands at 170 m (558 ft) tall. Along with the Mitsubishi Shoji Building, it houses the head office of the Mitsubishi Corporation.

See also 
 List of tallest structures in Tokyo

References

Skyscraper office buildings in Tokyo
Office buildings completed in 2009
Marunouchi
2009 establishments in Japan